The New Mexico Supreme Court Building is a courthouse located in the city of Santa Fe, county of Santa Fe, in the U.S. state of New Mexico. Both the New Mexico Supreme Court and New Mexico Court of Appeals operate in the building. It was added to the National Register of Historic Places listings in Santa Fe County, New Mexico in 2002.

History
Built in 1937 for $307,000, this Territorial Revival style public structure with hand-carved wood interiors was built by the Works Progress Administration. The state of New Mexico issued bonds of $175,000 to pay for its portion of the construction costs, and a tax of $2.50 was levied on each civil case docketed. During the Cold War in the 1950s, the building doubled as a fallout shelter.

Renovations
The original two elevators and a third elevator added in the 1960s have been upgraded to current standards. Over the decades, piping and court seating were upgraded, as were the electrical and heating systems, water pipes, communications lines, and emergency/fire alarm system. The building now has a digital telephone system. Structural and interior design renovations have brought the building up to date.

See also

National Register of Historic Places listings in Santa Fe County, New Mexico

References

External links
New Mexico Supreme Court official site

Buildings and structures in Santa Fe, New Mexico
Government of New Mexico
Government buildings in New Mexico
Territorial Revival architecture
Government buildings completed in 1937
Courthouses in New Mexico
Works Progress Administration in New Mexico
National Register of Historic Places in Santa Fe, New Mexico